Dottie Ardina (born c.1994) is a Filipino professional golfer.

Ardina won numerous amateur tournament in Asia and represented the Philippines at the Espirito Santo Trophy (World Amateur Team Championships) in 2006 and 2010. Her 2006 appearance, at age 12, made her the youngest player ever to compete at the World Amateur Team Championships.

Ardina turned professional in 2013.

Ardina has played on the Symetra Tour since 2014. Her best finish on the Symetra Tour was a tie for 2nd at the 2015 Four Winds Invitational. She also played on the LPGA Tour in 2014.

Also in 2014, she won the Thailand Singha-Sat LPGA Championship.

Ardina qualified for the 2016 Summer Olympics. While initially it was thought she would compete, ultimately she declared herself unable to compete due to Zika virus threat.

Amateur wins
this list may be incomplete
2010 Southern Ladies, Karambunai Open
2011 Queen Sirikit Cup, Truevisions International Junior, Philippine Closed Match Play, Malaysian Junior Open, Singha Thailand Open
2012 RSGC AmBank Junior Amateur Open, WWWExpress-DHL National Amateur, Philippine Amateur Championship (Closed), Taiwan Amateur, Penang Amateur, SICC DBS Junior Invitational
2013 Philippine Amateur Open, WWWExpress-DHL Amateur, TrueVisions International Junior # 12

Source:

Professional wins (3)

Epson Tour wins (1)

WPGA Tour of Australasia wins (1)
2020 (1) Ballarat Icons Pro-Am

Thai LPGA Tour wins (1) 
2014 (1) 3rd Singha-SAT Thai LPGA Championship

Team appearances
Espirito Santo Trophy (representing the Philippines): 2006, 2010, 2012

References

External links

Filipino female golfers
Southeast Asian Games medalists in golf
Southeast Asian Games gold medalists for the Philippines
Southeast Asian Games competitors for the Philippines
Competitors at the 2009 Southeast Asian Games
Golfers at the 2006 Asian Games
Golfers at the 2010 Asian Games
Asian Games competitors for the Philippines
1994 births
Living people